In the United Kingdom, junior doctors are qualified medical practitioners working whilst engaged in postgraduate training. The period of being a junior doctor starts when they qualify as a medical practitioner following graduation with a Bachelor of Medicine, Bachelor of Surgery degree and start the UK Foundation Programme, it culminates in a post as a Consultant, a General Practitioner (GP), or some other non-training post, such as a Staff grade or Associate Specialist post.

The term junior doctor currently incorporates the grades of Foundation doctor and Specialty registrar. Prior to 2007 it included the grades of Pre-registration house officer, Senior house officer and Specialist registrar.  During this time junior doctors will do postgraduate examinations to become members of a Medical royal college relevant to the specialty in which they are training, for example Membership of the Royal College of Physicians for doctors specialising in Internal medicine, Membership of the Royal College of Surgeons for doctors specialising in surgery or Membership of the Royal College of General Practitioners for doctors specialising in family medicine.  Doctors typically may be junior doctors for 8–20 years, and this may be extended by doing research towards a higher degree, for example towards a Doctor of Philosophy or Doctor of Medicine degree. In England there are around 71,000 junior doctors.

Working hours
In Europe and the US there has been some reduction of the working hours of doctors who are in postgraduate training, in line with recommendations and legislation aimed at improving patient safety and doctors’ working conditions. In 1991 the government, the NHS and the British Medical Association (BMA) agreed a package of measures on working hours, pay and conditions which was called the New Deal for Junior Doctors.  The Doctors' duty hours, which were felt to be excessive, were reduced to a maximum average of 56 hours actual work and 72 hours on call duty per week, although the change was not enforced until 1 December 2000.  The European Working Time Directive (EWTD) sets out minimum health and safety requirements for the organisation of working time. The EWTD required the average working week to fall to 48 hours or less by 2009.

The shortening of junior doctors' working hours had implications for how training programmes are organised, especially for specialties such as surgery where there was a tradition of maximising the hours of experience. Most studies that have looked at a reduction of junior doctors working hours have found either a beneficial or neutral impact in terms of measures of patient safety, clinical outcomes and postgraduate training.

The reduction in number of hours worked by junior doctors is one of the factors leading to blurring distinctions between them and other clinical professions such as nurse practitioners who also perform complex tasks.

Migration
An Organisation for Economic Co-operation and Development survey in December 2015 showed that 35.4% of NHS doctors, 34,000, were born abroad compared with 5% in Italy, 10.7% in Germany and 19.5% in France. The UK was the second highest exporter of doctors, second only to Germany, with 17,000 British doctors working in other OECD countries. These figures are for all doctors in the NHS, not just junior doctors.

According to the Career Destination Report published by the UK Foundation Programme Office in 2019, an increasing number of UK junior doctors are seeking to take up work abroad. A report by the General Medical Council described a number of "push" and "pull" factors, including seeking a better work-life balance and wanting to take advantage of other opportunities abroad. Notably most doctors who complete foundation training do eventually return to specialty training in the UK within three years.

Modernising medical careers
In 2005 postgraduate medical training was significantly changed in the Modernising Medical Careers programme. A two-year Foundation Programme was introduced for newly qualified doctors, the number of years of postgraduate training changed in some specialities, and doctors needed to decide which speciality to follow sooner after graduation.

There were later initiatives to engage junior doctors in NHS leadership; junior doctors are seen as essential to the drives to achieve efficiency savings in the NHS since 2010.

Pay and conditions

The NHS Careers web site stated in 2019:

The basic salaries outlined are defined for a contract of 40 hours per week. Salaries are increased proportionally for any extra hours worked on average per week. Any hours outside "social" hours, namely 9pm and 7am, are supplemented by a 37% enhanced rate. Weekend duty is paid as a percentage bonus, up to 10% of the basic salary for working alternate (1 in 2) weekends. Other bonuses are also available for being non-resident on-call (being not physically on site, but available to answer calls or come in to hospital if necessary), for recruitment into academia and undersubscribed specialties, and for doctors living and working in London. In 2015 NHS Employers reported the total annual earnings for foundation doctors in England averaged just over £36,000. While the basic starting salary for doctors in speciality training was £30,002, NHS Employers were reporting that average earnings in this group of doctors was nearly £53,000.

In 2013 graduates who had studied medicine or dentistry were the most likely to be employed and had the highest average gross annual pay when compared to graduates who studied other subjects. In 2015, the average starting salary of junior doctors was the third-highest of all graduate starting salaries, after dentistry and chemical engineering. In 2016, it was reported that after 10 years of employment medicine graduates had the highest salary of all degrees. Research conducted in December 2014 showed that across a range of other jobs, almost a third of graduate programmes at Britain's best known and leading employers paid starting salaries of more than £35,000; however, 83% of these leading employers reported that they were recruiting for jobs in London where salaries are higher, whereas NHS salaries are set on a nationwide basis, with doctors in London given an additional payment (£2,162 as of 2013) known as London weighting to compensate for increased cost of living.

Since 2007 junior doctors have been receiving below inflation salary rises. The independent Review Body on Doctors' and Dentists' Remuneration (DDRB) takes evidence from a range of sources and makes recommendations around pay; in 2015 they recommended a 1% pay increase. In 2005, the average starting earnings (salary plus bonuses) for a medical graduate was £32,086. In an inflationary environment all wage-earners, including doctors, may find the buying power of their income becomes less; some describe this as a real-terms cut in pay of 15% between 2007-2014. In 2019, the British Medical Association came to an agreement with NHS England to settle for a guaranteed 2% annual pay rise until 2023.

Expenses

Doctors pay professional annual fees to maintain registration with the General Medical Council and medical indemnity cover. Junior doctors also incur costs associated with training courses, preparing for and sitting exams and college membership; training can be associated with £420-£3,000 of professional fees annually, depending on stage of training and level of income. English students embarking on a medical degree could in 2015 expect to pay £40,000 on university tuition fees alone. Student loans are available to meet these costs, with repayment starting as soon as individuals begin working as a junior doctor. University tuition in Scotland is free for students ordinarily resident in Scotland, and grants and loans are available to help with living costs.

Changes to working patterns of doctors meant there was no longer a requirement for first year junior doctors to be resident, and from 2008 free accommodation was no longer provided by employers. The British Medical Association said that this amounted to a £4,800 annual pay cut for those who might have previously lived at the hospital rather than independently, but the numbers of doctors involved was not clear. Ann Keen, Labour Parliamentary Under-Secretary for Health Services, stated "The provision of free accommodation for foundation year 1 doctors who are on call at night, is dependent on the contract of employment of the junior doctor, which is for agreement locally. The Junior Doctors Terms and Conditions of Service continue to provide that if a doctor is contractually required to live in hospital accommodation no charges should be made for the accommodation provided."

Prospects
The NHS Careers web site states:

Pension scheme

Junior doctors may pay into the NHS Pension Scheme which from April 2015 has been a Career Average Revalued Earnings (CARE) scheme. The 2015 scheme involves paying towards a pension which will be based on the average of a member's pensionable earnings throughout their whole career, with a revaluation of active members benefits in line with the Consumer price index plus 1.5 per cent per annum. The 1995/2008 scheme is closed to new entrants.

Contract dispute in England

Since 2012 NHS Employers and the BMA had been in negotiation towards a new contract for junior doctors. These talks ran into serious problems when the Secretary of State for Health, Jeremy Hunt, appeared willing to impose items from the Conservative 2015 election manifesto upon junior doctors in England.

On 12 January 2016, Junior Doctors in England took part in the first general strike across the NHS, the first such industrial action in 40 years. Emergency care was still provided. There have been claims that the Medical Director of NHS England, Professor Sir Bruce Keogh, has used performance target levels to justify and encourage NHS Trusts to declare an emergency situation, forcing Junior Doctors to work despite the strike, a move to which the BMA has condemned.

In September 2015, Hunt proposed new contracts for junior doctors which would scrap overtime rates for work between 7am and 10pm on every day except Sunday while increasing their basic pay in a move that Hunt said would be cost neutral, a claim the BMA say NHS Employers have been unable to support with robust data. In response, the doctor's union, the BMA, called for a strike, the first since the 1970s. The strike vote started on 5 November. In November 2015, the BMA balloted over 37,700 of their members in response to Hunt's contract proposals; 76% of eligible doctors voted with 99.6% of doctors voting for action short of strike and 98% voting for all out strike.  In November 2015 Hunt said he would offer a basic pay increase of 11%, but still removing compensation for longer hours. On 19 November 2015 the result of the BMA strike ballot was announced, with more than 99% in favour of industrial action short of a strike, and 98% voting for full strike action. Hunt said the strike was "very disappointing", but declined the appeal for arbitration at this time. He was criticized for failing to answer MP's questions about the strike, with his deputy claiming he was too busy preparing for the strike. Hunt eventually agreed to discussions overseen by Acas. After five days of talks between the government and BMA, Hunt withdrew his threat to impose a new contract without agreement and the strike action that had been planned for December was suspended. The first day of strike action was called off hours before it was due to start (too late to avoid some disruption), with later days suspended.

On 24 December 2015, Dr Johann Malawana, leader of the BMA’s junior doctors committee (JDC), gave a 4 January deadline for the talks to result an acceptable outcome, or industrial action would be announced. An agreement was not reached by this deadline and so the BMA announced that a strike would go ahead, blaming "the government's continued failure to address junior doctors’ concerns about the need for robust contractual safeguards on safe working, and proper recognition for those working unsocial hours". The first day of the strike went ahead on 12 January. Junior doctors again withdrew their labour for routine care on 10 February 2016, leading to the cancellation of around 3,000 elective operations.

Rest breaks
In a case involving University Hospitals of Derby and Burton NHS Foundation Trust in July 2019 the Court of Appeal decided that the trust had breached the 2002 contract for junior doctors because their hours and rest periods had been underestimated by commercial software over some years. The case will affect other NHS employers and substantial arrears will be due.

Risks to patients
The period in August where there was a large changeover of hospital staff has sometimes been dubbed the "killing season" (due to a perception that there is an associated rise in the number of patient deaths). In 2009 research looking at emergency admissions to hospitals in England established that a small but statistically significant increase in patient mortality was occurring during August. The limited data was collected retrospectively over an 8-year period, comparing two week-long blocks (one week prior to commencement, one week post commencement). The methodology meant that drawing firm conclusions was unwise with correlation not implying causation. In the month when junior doctors start working - when other factors are adjusted for patients had a 6% increase in mortality. For patients admitted as an emergency who were not requiring surgery or suffering from cancer, the mortality rate increased by 7.86%.

Other concerns have been raised regarding mortality following admission to hospital at a weekend. A research paper published in 2012, looked retrospectively at data from 2009; the study observed an increase in 30-day mortality for people admitted to hospital on Saturday and Sunday, compared to mid-week days. The risk of dying in a hospital on Saturday or Sunday was actually less than on a weekday. The data in the study did not enable the authors to describe the cause of this so-called weekend effect. Subsequently, there has been considerable speculation around whether the availability of consultants was a factor. The authors of the paper have also openly criticised the conclusions drawn by the government and popular media on the paper, saying that to draw such conclusions as to associated decreased weekend staffing levels to increased mortality at 30 days post-admission would be "rash and misleading".

Health Education England produces reports on NHS trusts under “enhanced monitoring” by the General Medical Council, because of concerns from trainees.  20 of these were analysed by the Health Service Journal in 2020. Bolton NHS Foundation Trust and Barking, Havering and Redbridge University Hospitals NHS Trust featured prominently.  Reports included consultants leaving junior doctors with insufficient support, bullying, reluctance to report concerns and IT problems.  It has the power to withdraw trainees from trusts but this was only used once since the start of 2019.

See also
 Foundation doctor
 Specialty registrar
 Bullying in medicine
 List of health and medical strikes
 Early career doctor

References

External links
 A patient's guide to doctors in training by the AoMRC

Physicians
Healthcare occupations in the United Kingdom